Taron-Avia was an Armenian airline headquartered in Yerevan. The airline ceased all operations in 2019.

History
The airline was founded in 2007 and originally had four Boeing 737-500 aircraft.

The company had temporarily ceased operations in 2018 however it had since resumed operations.

Taron-Avia operated regular and charter flights from Shirak International Airport and Zvartnots International Airport. As of June 2019, Taron Avia had focused its efforts on the transfer of Georgian citizens to and from Russia via Armenia, following Russian President Vladimir Putin’s order on suspending Russian flights to Georgia.

In November 2019, the Armenian aviation authorities revoked the airlines operational license forcing them to suspend all operations after inspections turned out insufficient outcomes.

Fleet

The Taron Avia fleet consisted of the following aircraft (as of August 2019):

See also
 Armenia Aircompany
 Atlantis Armenian Airlines
 Transport in Armenia

References

External links

Official website 

Defunct airlines of Armenia
Airlines established in 2007
Airlines disestablished in 2019
Armenian brands
Transport in Armenia
2019 disestablishments in Armenia
Armenian companies established in 2007